Halo is the seventh studio album by Argentine singer-songwriter Juana Molina, released on May 5, 2017 by Crammed Discs.

Title and artwork
The title Halo is a reference to the Argentine folk legend for the will-o'-the-wisp, known as the "luz mala" (Spanish for "evil light"), which floats above the ground where bones are buried.

Critical reception

Upon release, Halo received widespread acclaim from critics. At Metacritic, which assigns a normalized rating out of 100 to reviews from mainstream critics, the album received an average score of 84, based on 13 reviews. Robin Denselow from The Guardian gave the album a positive review, writing: "There are sturdy melodies on the quietly charming "Cosoco" or "Cálculos y oráculos", but even an apparently conventional song is soon transformed by her edgy and intriguing off-kilter soundscapes." Drowned in Sounds Lee Adcock gave the album the highest rating and felt that "even for Molina, who has trekked odysseys through drone and voice before, Halo marks an epiphany in the science of travel. How does one hour flow so swiftly? How do the echoes of former futures sound so fresh again, as if their waning promise of grandeur never faded?"

Accolades
In The Village Voices Pazz & Jop, an poll regarding the best albums of the year as voted by more than 400 American music critics, Halo ranked number 97 with 78 points.

Track listing

References

External links
 
  statistics, tagging and previews at Last.fm
 Halo at Rate Your Music

2017 albums
Juana Molina albums
Albums recorded at Sonic Ranch